Michael Rao is an American academic administrator who is the current president of Virginia Commonwealth University, a public university in downtown Richmond, Virginia. During his time as president, Rao has overseen hiring and expansion of the university's facilities. Rao previously served as the president of Central Michigan University in Mount Pleasant, Michigan and Mission College in Santa Clara, California. Additionally, he served as the Chancellor of Montana State University–Northern.

Early life and education 
Rao, the son of a physician from Mumbai, India, was born in Boston, Massachusetts.  At age eight, he moved with his mother to rural Pasco County, Florida, after the early death of his father, Suresh Rao.

He received his bachelor's degree in Chemistry from the University of South Florida and his doctorate in Higher Education Administration from the University of Florida.

Academic career
Rao has been an administrator for more than 20 years. In the late 1980s and early 1990s, Rao served in the private sector as a higher education academic program planner. In this role, he created master plans for the University of Washington system and the University of California. He also served as assistant to the president at the University of Florida, a member of the Association of American Universities (AAU).

In 1992, Rao became a dean at Mission College in Santa Clara, California, and became president of the college two years later. This move gave him the distinction of being the youngest college president in the country at that time. In 1998, he became chancellor of Montana State University–Northern, in Havre.

Rao was chosen to be president of Central Michigan University (CMU), a large public, research university in the year 2000. His work at Central Michigan University focused on interdisciplinary academic program development, economic development through commercialization of research, fundraising for the university, and outreach to the Central Michigan region. During his tenure and despite state budget cuts, CMU significantly increased faculty positions and research productivity, developed academic programs and improved performance. Under Rao's leadership, CMU gained approval to establish a medical school and M.D. degree program, partnering with large healthcare systems. When he left CMU in 2009, Rao was one of the three longest-serving presidents among Michigan's 15 public universities.

Virginia Commonwealth University presidency
Rao was selected to be the president of Virginia Commonwealth University in 2009. He was selected for honoris causa membership in Omicron Delta Kappa at VCU in 2015.

Inauguration
Michael Rao was officially installed as VCU's fifth president on October 14, 2011 in an inauguration ceremony at the Siegel Center. The event was marked with two weeks of activities designed to highlight the urban university's commitment to student success, academic excellence, research and human health. VCU hosted a Presidential Inauguration Research Lecture Series, a university-wide food drive, and events highlighting VCU's commitment to sustainability. VCU also launched a new tradition recognizing the inaugural class of “University Scholars,” undergraduate students who have completed 54-84 credits and have attained outstanding academic achievement.

In December 2011, VCU extended Michael Rao's contract through June 30, 2017, with automatic renewals allowing for a possible extension until 2020.

Rao's VCU salary is the highest among all employees of the Commonwealth of Virginia, at $1,020,828 for the 2018-2019 fiscal year, a 109% increase from his 2009 annual salary of $488,500.

Protests 
While president, Rao overlooked a series of protests by adjunct faculty at VCU. The coalition behind the protests critiqued Rao's salary while many adjuncts made poverty level wages. Ahead of the 2018-19 budget, $4.2 million was allocated to increase adjunct faculty funding from $800 to $1,000 per credit hour, about $1,000 less than what the coalition was demanding.

Ghostwriting scandal 
In September 2019, it was reported that Rao had signed as the sole author of an opinion piece that he had not written. The January 2019 op-ed, printed in the Richmond Times-Dispatch, supported a private development in that city but had been ghostwritten by an employee of the private development. The executive editor of the Richmond Times-Dispatch stated that the newspaper would not have published the piece if it has known of its true origin. Rao's actions were also criticized by independent ethics experts.

Personal life
Rao is married to Monica Rao, a professional watercolorist and graphic designer from Bangalore. They have two sons.

References 

Virginia Commonwealth University administrators
Presidents of Central Michigan University
University of Florida College of Education alumni
University of South Florida alumni
Living people
Montana State University–Northern
American academics of Indian descent
1967 births